Praealticus tanegasimae is a species of combtooth blenny found in the western Pacific ocean.  This species grows to a length of  SL.

References

tanegasimae
Taxa named by David Starr Jordan
Taxa named by Edwin Chapin Starks
Fish described in 1906